The 2017 National League play-off Final , known as the Vanarama National League Promotion Final for sponsorship reasons, was held on 14 May 2017 at Wembley Stadium and contested between Forest Green Rovers and Tranmere Rovers at the end of the 2016–17 National League season. It was the 15th National League play-off Final, the second under the name National League and the tenth to be played at Wembley. Forest Green Rovers won the match 3–1 to earn promotion to the English Football League for the first time in their history.

Match

Details

References

play-off Final 2017
2017
Play-off Final 2017
Play-off Final 2017
National League play-off Final
National League play-off final
Events at Wembley Stadium